Muragan is an indigenous Australian ancestral deity from North-Eastern Australia. Its worshipers may have spoken Kunjen, or some Kunjen dialect. The Australian Muragan is also believed to be the progenitor of the Tamil-Indian Murugan. Muragan is believed to have been the name of an actual people from the state of Queensland.

Country
The Muragan were located on the middle Mitchell river then northwards to the Alice River.

Notes

Citations

Sources

Aboriginal peoples of Queensland